The 2016 Japan Series was the 67th edition of Nippon Professional Baseball's postseason championship series. The Hiroshima Toyo Carp, champions of the Central League, played the Hokkaido Nippon-Ham Fighters, champions of the Pacific League, in a best-of-seven series beginning on October 22. The Japan Series was sponsored by the Sumitomo Mitsui Banking Corporation (SMBC) and was officially known as the SMBC Nippon Series 2016.

The Fighters defeated the Carp in six games. Hiroshima took the first two games, and Hokkaido won the next four games to take the series. Hokkaido's Brandon Laird won the Japan Series Most Valuable Player Award, and Hiroshima's Brad Eldred won the Fighting Spirit Award, given to the best player on the losing team; it was the first time two foreign players won both awards. Anthony Bass, Sho Nakata, and Haruki Nishikawa won outstanding player honors.

Climax Series

Series notes
The Hokkaido Nippon-Ham Fighters defeated the Fukuoka SoftBank Hawks in the Pacific League Climax Series, four games to two. Sho Nakata was named the most valuable player of the series. The Fighters last won the Japan Series in 2006. They lost the Japan Series in 2007, 2009, and 2012.

The Hiroshima Toyo Carp defeated the Yokohama DeNA BayStars in the Central League Climax Series, four games to one. Kosuke Tanaka was named the series' most valuable player. Hiroshima had not appeared in the Japan Series since 1991. Hiroshima pitcher Hiroki Kuroda announced that he would retire following the series.

Summary

Game summaries

Game 1

Kris Johnson, the Carp's starting pitcher, allowed one run in  innings pitched, while Hokkaido's Shohei Ohtani allowed three runs in six innings. Hiroshima's Ryuhei Matsuyama and Brad Eldred both hit home runs off of Ohtani in the fourth inning, while Hokkaido's Brandon Laird hit a home run in the seventh inning. Hiroshima responded in the seventh inning with a run batted in (RBI) single by Yoshihiro Maru and a RBI sacrifice fly by Eldred.

Game 2

Yui Kamiji threw the ceremonial first pitch. The Carp broke the game open with a four-run sixth inning, which included Eldred's second home run of the series. Yusuke Nomura, who led the Central League with 16 wins during the regular season, allowed one unearned run in six innings pitched for Hiroshima.

Game 3

Kuroda allowed one run in  innings for the Carp, leaving the game due to a leg injury. Eldred hit a two-run home run, his third of the series. Hokkaido took the lead with a two RBI double by Sho Nakata in the eighth inning, and Tomohiro Abe tied the game for Hiroshima with an RBI single in the ninth inning. Ohtani, playing as Hokkaido's designated hitter, hit two doubles earlier in the game and drove in the game-winning run with an RBI single in the tenth inning, scoring Haruki Nishikawa.

Game 4

Hiroshima took a 1–0 lead in the fourth inning, when Takahiro Arai scored on an error committed by Kensuke Kondo. Hokkaido's Sho Nakata hit a home run to tie the game in the sixth inning. Brandon Laird broke the tie with a two-run home run in the eighth inning for Hokkaido. Hiroshima had the bases loaded in the ninth inning, but Naoki Miyanishi recorded the save by striking out Yoshihiro Maru.

Game 5

Johnson started Game 5 for Hiroshima, while Takayuki Kato started for Hokkaido. Seiya Suzuki had an RBI single in the first inning for Hiroshima. Kato failed to complete the second inning, and Luis Mendoza threw  scoreless innings for the Fighters. Johnson did not allow a run in six innings pitched. Takuya Nakashima had an RBI single to tie the game for Hokkaido in the seventh inning. Nishikawa hit a walk-off grand slam in the bottom of the ninth inning for Hokkaido.

Game 6

With the game tied 4–4 in the eighth inning, Nakata drew a bases loaded walk, Anthony Bass hit an RBI single, and Laird hit a grand slam. Laird, who hit three home runs in the series, won the Japan Series Most Valuable Player Award, while Eldred won the Fighting Spirit Award, given to the best player on the losing team. Bass, Nakata, and Nishikawa earned outstanding player honors for the series.

See also
2016 Korean Series
2016 World Series

References

2016
2016 Nippon Professional Baseball season
October 2016 sports events in Japan
Hiroshima Toyo Carp
Hokkaido Nippon-Ham Fighters